Keith Valley is a valley in the U.S. state of Georgia.

Keith Valley was named for the local Keith family of pioneer settlers.

References

Landforms of Catoosa County, Georgia
Valleys of Georgia (U.S. state)